Ustad Sultan Khan & Friends: Yaad Piya Ki Aayi is a studio album by Indian sarangi player and classical vocalist, Ustad Sultan Khan. The album released on 17 March 2014. Music for the tracks have been given by Suhel Khan, with lyrics written by Jameel Mujahid.

Overview 
All the tracks have lyrics in the Hindi language, with a few verses of English in "Maahi". Though the title of the album goes by the name of Ustad Sultan Khan, he only appears in three tracks, "Yaad Piya Ki Aayi", its Lounge Mix version and "Jhanki Laagi Chhaon Ki". Except for three tracks, Jameel Mujahid has written the lyrics of the songs. The album explores the various forms of Indian classical music. Sitar is the chief instrument used in "Yaad Piya Ki Aayi", the most appreciated piece of the album. "Maula" is a Sufi devotional track with shades of Qawwali. "Jaane Kyon" and "Usne Hamein Phir Yaad Kiya" are ghazals.

Personnel 
As listed by WorldCat.

Technical and lyrics
 Suhel Khan – music arrangement
 Vinod Bhatt – music arrangement
 George – music arrangement
 Shahdab Hussain – rhythm arrangement
 Jameel Mujahid – writer
 Rameez – writer
 Muztar Indori – writer

On instruments
 Ustad Rais Khan – sitar
 Suhel Khan – sitar
 Farhan Khan – sitar
 Ustad Sultan Khan – sarangi

Sounding
 Suhel Khan – composer
 Suhel Khan – vocals
 Ustad Sultan Khan – vocals
 Sadhana Sargam – vocals
 Shreya Ghoshal – vocals
 Bhupinder Singh – vocals
 Mitali Singh – vocals
 Zubeen Garg – vocals
 Ustad Rais Khan – vocals
 Farhan Khan – vocals
 Husnain Khan – vocals
 Tarannum Bakshi – vocals
 Bilqees Khanum – vocals
 Suhel Khan – vocals

Track listing

See also 
 Women's Day Special: Spreading Melodies Everywhere
 Moments of Love: Pyar Ke Do Pal

References

External links 
 Purchase from Flipkart
 Purchase from Amazon
 Online streaming on Saavn
 Tower Records
 Online streaming on Music India Online

2007 classical albums
Hindustani classical music albums